Robert Joseph Shea (February 14, 1933 – March 10, 1994) was an American novelist and former journalist best known as co-author with Robert Anton Wilson of the science fantasy trilogy Illuminatus! It became a cult success and was later turned into a marathon-length stage show put on at the British National Theatre and elsewhere. In 1986 it won the Prometheus Hall of Fame Award. Shea went on to write several action novels based in exotic historical settings.

Other works
Shea wrote several historical action novels, including Shike (1981), a two-volume novel set in Ancient Japan about the warrior monk Jebu and his love Lady Shima Taniko, All Things Are Lights (1986), and The Saracen, a novel published in two volumes in 1989 depicting the struggle between a blond Muslim warrior called Daoud ibn Abdullah and his French crusader adversary, Simon de Gobignon. His last published book was the Native American tale Shaman (1991).

All Things Are Lights and the outline for the unfinished novel Children of Earthmaker have been released under a Creative Commons license and are available to read and copy at Robert Shea's website. Lady Yang was finished but never published; a Creative Commons online version is in the works by Shea's son Michael.

Three of his lectures and two panel discussions he participated in were recorded when he was a featured speaker at both the Starwood Festival and the WinterStar Symposium (both with and without Robert Anton Wilson) and produced by the Association for Consciousness Exploration.

For several years, Shea edited the anarchist zine No Governor.  The title comes from a quote attributed to Zhuangzi, "There is no governor anywhere."  The zine was mentioned in and read by one of the characters in Illuminatus!.

Clipped from the Robert J. Shea Tribute page:

Robert Joseph Shea attended Manhattan Prep, Manhattan College and Rutgers University and worked as a magazine editor in New York and Los Angeles. In the 60's he edited the Playboy Forum where he met Robert Anton Wilson, with whom he collaborated on Illuminatus! After publishing Illuminatus!, Bob left Playboy to become a full time novelist. His novels include: Shike, set in medieval Japan; All Things Are Lights, a story that entwines the fate of Cathars of southern France with the occult traditions of Courtly Love and the troubadours; The Saracen, describing the intricate politics of medieval Italy through the eyes of an Islamic warrior; Shaman, tracing the fate of the survivors of the Black Hawk War in 19th century Illinois; Lady Yang, a tragic story of an idealistic empress of medieval China.

Shea was a resident of Glencoe, Illinois He was survived by his son, Michael E. Shea, and his second wife, author Patricia Monaghan.

Bibliography 
 The Illuminatus! Trilogy (with Robert Anton Wilson) Full Trilogy printed December 1, 1983 by Dell: , 
 The Eye in the Pyramid (1975) Dell
 The Golden Apple (1975) Dell
 Leviathan (1975) ISBN Dell
 Shike (January 13, 1992) Two in One version: Ballantine Books 
 Time of the Dragons (June 1, 1981) Jove  
 Last of the Zinja (July 1, 1981) Jove  
 All Things Are Lights (April 12, 1986) Ballantine Books  
 From No Man's Land to Plaza del Lago (October 1987) Amer References , 
 The Saracen - both books available as free downloads from Project Gutenberg  and 
 Land of the Infidel (February 13, 1989) Ballantine Books, 
 The Holy War (March 13, 1989) Ballantine Books 
 Shaman (February 20, 1991) Ballantine Books  - Available as a free download from Project Gutenberg

Recorded lectures & panel discussions
 A Meeting With Robert Shea, ACE
 Writing and Mysticism, ACE
 Magic in the Central Empire, ACE
 The Once and Future Legend (panel discussion with Ariana Lightningstorm, Patricia Monaghan, Jeff Rosenbaum, Rev. Ivan Stang, and Robert Anton Wilson), ACE
 What IS the Conspiracy, Anyway? (Panel Discussion with Anodea Judith, Jeff Rosenbaum, Rev. Ivan Stang, and Robert Anton Wilson), ACE

References

External links 
 Robert Shea's Official Website: Robert J. Shea's official website maintained by his son, Michael E. Shea.  The site includes creative commons licensed versions of All Things Are Lights and other works.
 
 
 

Novels by Robert Shea
1933 births
1994 deaths
20th-century American novelists
American anarchists
American historical novelists
American male novelists
Manhattan College alumni
Playboy people
20th-century American male writers